Equid hybrids, also called hybrid equines, are created from the crossing of members from the horse family such as a horse, donkey and zebra.

History 

Hybrid equids have been created since ancient times.  As early as the 3rd millennium BC, Mesopotamians crossbred the domestic donkey with the now-extinct Syrian wild ass to produce a hybrid known as a Kunga.  Horse-donkey hybrids (the mule and hinny) are also of ancient vintage, as evidenced by their presence in works such as the Iliad and the Hebrew Bible.

Zebroids are known from more recent times; in 1820, George Douglas, 16th Earl of Morton hybridized a domestic horse with a quagga (see Lord Morton's mare).

From the 20th century on, a greater diversity of equid hybrids have been created, beginning with the crossbreeding of zebras and donkeys. Equid hybrids can be traced back to Africa where there are vast amount of equid species which resulted in natural crossing, creating hybrid species. These hybrids were found to be more efficient than the original species because they possess certain traits of both species, so scientists began to experiment by crossing other species of horse family and categorizing them as equid hybrids. Equid hybrids are now bred commercially. Mules bred from mammoth studs and stock or draft mares can be as large as 17 hands and are as strong as a normal horse. Other mules are bred for pets or for entertainment such as zoos; these are the miniature horses or miniature donkeys.

Nomenclature 

Hybrids are named based on the sex and species of the parents. Hybrids are typically given a portmanteau name, combining the first half of the father’s name and the second half of the mother's name. For example, the cross between a male zebra and a female horse is a zorse. A cross between a male zebra and a female donkey is a zonkey.

Horse-donkey crosses are an exception to this naming convention. A mule is the cross between female horse and male donkey. A hinny is the cross of male horse and female donkey; mules and hinnies are reciprocal hybrids.

Zebroid 
 A male zebra and a female donkey creates a zonkey
 A male zebra and a female horse creates a zorse 
 A male zebra and a female pony creates a zony or, if a female Shetland pony, a Zetland
 A male donkey and a female zebra creates a donkra
 A male horse and a female zebra creates a hebra
 An extinct quagga and a horse created a Lord Morton's mare

Nature of the animals 

Zebras are usually wild animals, but when they are raised with other domestic horses, they are tame enough to be ridden draught. Mules are smaller, more resistant to heat and exhaustion and much stronger. Horses are much larger, but likely to suffer from exhaustion and heat.

Fertility of equid hybrids 
Male mules (johns) are sterile, but fertile female mules (mollies) sometimes occur.

The different number and different structure in chromosomes makes it difficult for them to pair up properly. Donkeys have 62 chromosomes and horses have 64, so their hybrids (mules and hinnies) have 63. Zebras have between 32 and 46 (depending on the species) and their hybrids are sterile and infertile.

It is harder to cross species if the female has fewer chromosomes than the males, as in the crossing of a stallion and a jenny (female donkey); this results in minimal breeding of hinnies.

Przewalski's horses have 66 chromosomes, and can produce fertile offspring with domestic horses.

Conditions 
Mules are more tolerant to heat than horses; horses are more efficient in cold weather. Mules, like donkeys, are more effective in deserts. Horses are more likely to suffer from exhaustion compared to mules. While mules are relatively slower than horses, they are much safer to ride. Mules consume less food than horses, and can live longer.

See also
Hybrid (biology)
Equidae

References

External links
The Free Dictionary definition of Equids

Equid hybrids